Thomas Ives Chatfield (October 4, 1871 – December 24, 1922) was a United States district judge of the United States District Court for the Eastern District of New York.

Education and career

Born on October 4, 1871, in Owego, New York, Chatfield received an Artium Baccalaureus degree in 1893 from Yale University. He received a Bachelor of Laws in 1896 from Columbia Law School. He entered private practice in New York City, New York from 1896 to 1906. He was an Assistant United States Attorney for the Eastern District of New York from 1902 to 1906.

Federal judicial service

Chatfield was nominated by President Theodore Roosevelt on December 13, 1906, to a seat on the United States District Court for the Eastern District of New York vacated by Judge Edward B. Thomas. He was confirmed by the United States Senate on January 9, 1907, and received his commission the same day. His service terminated on December 24, 1922, due to his death at his home in Brooklyn, New York. He had been stricken with a heart attack while trimming the family Christmas tree, the heart attack having been induced by a bout of typhoid fever from which he suffered the previous summer.

Family

Chatfield was the son of State Senator Thomas I. Chatfield (1818–1884) and Lucy B. (Goodrich) Chatfield.

References

External links
 
 
 

Judges of the United States District Court for the Eastern District of New York
1871 births
1922 deaths
United States district court judges appointed by Theodore Roosevelt
20th-century American judges
Columbia Law School alumni
People from Owego, New York
Yale University alumni
Assistant United States Attorneys